Sam's Game was a short lived sitcom, starring TV presenter Davina McCall and comedian Ed Byrne.

It also featured some actors from well-known TV dramas: Tameka Empson of EastEnders, Shaun Evans of Endeavour and Tristan Gemmill of Coronation Street.

Cast

Davina McCall as Sam
Ed Byrne as Alex
Shaun Evans as Tom
Tameka Empson as Marcia
Tristan Gemmill as Phil

Reception

The show debuted poorly in the ratings. The show was widely panned by critics.

References

External links

2001 British television series debuts
2001 British television series endings
2000s British sitcoms
ITV sitcoms
English-language television shows